Calyptromyia is a genus of flies in the family Tachinidae.

Species
C. barbata Villeneuve, 1915
C. stupenda Dear, 1981

References

Phasiinae
Diptera of Asia
Diptera of Africa
Tachinidae genera
Taxa named by Joseph Villeneuve de Janti